Brissia Daniela Mayagoitia Orta better known as Brissia (born August 3, 1991, in Saltillo, Coahuila) is a Mexican singer and actress. She was a former member of Mexican pop band La Nueva Banda. Mayagoitia left the band to become a solo artist in 2008. The remaining band members continued without her, but split in the spring of 2009.

Career 
When she was twelve years old, Brissia participated in the second season of the Mexican reality TV show for children, Código F.A.M.A. She placed fifth and received a silver medal.

In 2006, Brissia participated in the Telemundo reality singing competition Quinceañera: Mamá Quiero Ser Artista in the United States. On the show, competed with female teenage singers from across Latin American and the US, including pre American Idol alum Allison Iraheta for the main prize of $50,000 and a recording contract. Brissia finished in second place with Iraheta taking the grand prize.

In 2007, she took part in a reality show called Buscando a Timbiriche, La Nueva Banda. She selected as the first member of the band. She sang the first song on their album, along with teammate Eduardo. Brissia left the band in 2009 to pursue a solo career. In 2011, Brissia was cast as in a lead role in the Mexican theatre production of Hairspray with friend and former La Nueva Banda bandmate, Eduardo Brito. The pair were invited to perform at festivals throughout Mexico in late 2010. In August 2011, Brissia was cast in an episode of the Mexican television series, Como Dice El Dicho. The episode is expected to air in September 2011. This appearance will mark Brissia's debut appearance as an actress as well as her first television appearance since Buscando a Timbiriche, La Nueva Banda. Brissia will also debut her first single as a solo artist on the episode.

In 2013, Brissia posed for Playboy Mexico magazine in the January issue.

Personal life
Shortly after winning a spot in La Nueva Banda Timbiriche, Brissia began dating César D'Alessio, son of Mexican singer and actress Lupita D'Alessio. The couple split up in 2010. In spring 2008, Brissia also announced that she did not wish to participate in La Nueva Banda and revealed her desire to start a solo career. Since leaving La Nueva Banda, Brissia moved to Mexico City with her family and continues to keep in contact with her friend and former bandmate, Eduarado "Lalo" Brito.

Discography 
La Nueva Banda Timbiriche (2007)

Singles 
Tú, tú, tú*
Aunque Digas
Sales: 85,000

Filmography

Theatre
2010: Hairspray (Mexican version)

Television
2011: Como dice el dicho ('El Que Es Buen Gallo Donde Quiera Canta') as Mayte.
2011: Tengo Talento Mucho Talento ('Estrella TV')

References 

1991 births
Living people
Mexican women singers
Timbiriche members
Buscando a Timbiriche, La Nueva Banda contestants
Singers from Coahuila